Otto Pohla (20 March 1899 – July 1941) was an Estonian wrestler. He competed in the men's Greco-Roman light heavyweight at the 1928 Summer Olympics. He was killed during World War II when the ship he was on was sunk by German submarines.

Personal life
Pohla worked as a plumber. After the commencement of Operation Barbarossa, he was mobilized into the Red Army and trained in Tallinn. Whilst sailing to Leningrad for deployment, Pohla and several hundred other soldiers died when the transport ship carrying them was sunk by German submarines. Pohla and the other recruits were listed as missing in action until they were declared dead in January 1943.

References

1899 births
1941 deaths
Estonian male sport wrestlers
Olympic wrestlers of Estonia
Wrestlers at the 1928 Summer Olympics
People from Kohila Parish
Soviet military personnel killed in World War II
Missing in action of World War II
Deaths due to shipwreck at sea
Plumbers
19th-century Estonian people
20th-century Estonian people